Luke Hodge is a Italy international rugby league footballer who plays as a  forward for the Blacktown Workers Sea Eagles in the NSW Cup.

Background
Hodge is of Italian descent.

Playing career

Club career
Hodge previously played for the North Sydney Bears in the NSW Cup

International career
In 2022 Hodge was named in the Italy squad for the 2021 Rugby League World Cup.

References

External links
Italy profile

Living people
Italy national rugby league team players
Rugby league second-rows
Year of birth missing (living people)